N. grandis may refer to:
 Nyctibius grandis, the great potoo, a bird species found in tropical America
 Niltava grandis, the large niltava, a bird species found in Asia

See also
 Grandis (disambiguation)